Freedom is the second studio album by American country music singer Andy Griggs. Released in 2002 on RCA Records Nashville, it features the singles "How Cool Is That", "Tonight I Wanna Be Your Man", and "Practice Life", a duet with Martina McBride; respectively, these reached No. 22, No. 7, and No. 33 on the Hot Country Songs chart in 2002.

Track listing

Personnel
As listed in liner notes.
Kenny Aronoff – drums
Ron Block – banjo
Larry Byrom – acoustic guitar
Charles Cushman – acoustic guitar, banjo
Eric Darken – percussion
Dan Dugmore – acoustic guitar, bass guitar, Dobro, electric guitar, slide guitar, steel guitar
Stuart Duncan – fiddle, mandolin
Andy Griggs – lead vocals, background vocals, acoustic guitar
David Grissom – electric guitar
Aubrey Haynie – mandolin
Wes Hightower – background vocals
Tom Keifer – electric guitar and background vocals on "A Hundred Miles of Bad Road"
Michael Landau – electric guitar
Brent Mason – acoustic guitar, electric guitar
Martina McBride – background vocals on "Practice Life"
David Lee Murphy – background vocals
Jimmy Nichols – piano, keyboards, background vocals
Melinda Norris – background vocals
Michael Rhodes – bass guitar
Dave Roe – upright bass
Neil Thrasher – background vocals
Robby Turner – steel guitar
C. J. Udeen – steel guitar
Kenny Vaughan – acoustic guitar, electric guitar
Lonnie Wilson – background vocals
Glenn Worf – bass guitar

Chart performance

Album

Singles

References

2002 albums
Andy Griggs albums
RCA Records albums
Albums produced by David Malloy